Hemiolaus maryra is a butterfly in the family Lycaenidae. It is found on Madagascar. The habitat consists of forests.

References

Butterflies described in 1887
Hypolycaenini
Butterflies of Africa
Taxa named by Paul Mabille